The Unity Building in Chicago, Illinois, at 127 North Dearborn Street in the Chicago Loop, was a 17-story building that was once the tallest skyscraper in Chicago. Gustave Loehr had an office in this building, and it was in his office that Rotary Club of Chicago, held its first club meeting, on February 23, 1905.

The Unity Building was built between 1890 and 1892 by John Peter Altgeld, who became the 20th Governor of Illinois. It was demolished in 1989.

References 

1989 disestablishments in Illinois
1892 establishments in Illinois
Buildings and structures completed in 1892
Buildings and structures demolished in 1989
Demolished buildings and structures in Chicago
Skyscraper office buildings in Chicago